Evgrapi Shevardnadze Stadium is a multi-use stadium in Lanchkhuti, Georgia used mostly for football matches. It is the home stadium of FC Guria Lanchkhuti. The stadium is able to hold 4,500 people.

See also 
Stadiums in Georgia

Sports venues in Georgia (country)
Football venues in Georgia (country)
Buildings and structures in Guria